Shrigley and Hunt was an English firm which produced stained-glass windows and art tiles.

History

The business began in the 1750s when Shrigley's was a painting, carving and gilding firm in Lancaster, Lancashire.

In 1868, control of Shrigley's was passed to Arthur Hunt, a Londoner, who ran a stained glass and decorating business in the south of England. Hunt had worked under designer Henry Holiday at the firm of Heaton, Butler & Bayne. Holiday influenced Hunt to create brighter, more realistic and more understandable figures and stories from the bible. Hunt's chief designers were Carl Almquist who had also studied under Holiday, and E. H. Jewitt.

From 1878, the firm became known as Shrigley and Hunt, with premises on Castle Hill, Lancaster opposite the main gate of Lancaster Castle. The new company also had a showroom in London.

Hunt died in 1917 and leadership passed to Joseph Fisher. After World War II the company moved to West Road, Lancaster; fire destroyed much of those premises in 1973. The firm closed with Fisher's death in 1982.

Shrigley and Hunt made windows for many churches, including the Priory Church of St Mary in Lancaster and St Paul's Church in Scotforth. Their work can also be found throughout the UK and in Europe.

As well as stained glass, Shrigley and Hunt made ceramic tiles; in the late 19th century these formed an important part of the income of the company. Some of the tiles can be seen still in situ outside their former workshop on Castle Hill. The firm also produced craft decoration including stencilled wall and ceiling decoration.

Lancaster City Museum has a significant holding of Shrigley and Hunt material. This includes two panels by E. L. Eaton, a stained-glass window and its cartoon in the design of John O'Gaunt, several negatives showing posed figures for stained glass artists to copy, and two painted vases by William Lambert. Most other records of Shrigley & Hunt were lost in a fire.

List of Works
England
 St. Paul's Church, Bedford, Bedfordshire (Faith, Fortitude and Charity, 1885)
 St. Mary's Church, Amersham, Buckinghamshire (Annunciation, 1905)
 St. James' Church, Gerrards Cross, Buckinghamshire (Three Marys, 1894)
 St. Andrew's Church, Dent, Cumbria (1912)
 St. Clement's Church, Urmston, Greater Manchester (Martha and Mary)
 St. Boniface's Church, Bonchurch, Isle of Wight (St. Faith and St. John the Baptist)
 Holy Trinity Church, Blackpool, Lancashire
 St. Thomas' Church, Garstang, Lancashire (Ascension of Christ, 1877)
 St. Oswald's Church, Preesall, Lancashire (Annunciation and Gift of Tongues, 1971)
 St. Michael's Church, St Michael's on Wyre, Lancashire (1936)
 St. Mary's Church, East Bilney, Norfolk (St. Michael and St. Alban)
 St. Mary's Church, Higham Ferrers, Northamptonshire (Last Supper, 1897)
 St. Oswald's Church, Askrigg, North Yorkshire (Memorial to Metcalfe Thwaite, 1932)
 Bradford Cathedral, Bradford, West Yorkshire (Memorial to Cecil Rhodes and Parkinson, 1898)

Northern Ireland
 Mountjoy Parish Church, Cappagh, County Tyrone (Memorial to the fallen 1939-1945, 1950)

See also
 British and Irish stained glass (1811–1918)
 Victorian Era
 Gothic Revival

References

Footnotes

Bibliography

External links
 Silent footage of window manufacturing at Shrigley & Hunt c.1948 Produced by Sam Hanna, Burnley (Vimeo - North West Film Archive)
 Stained Glass in Wales: Shrigley & Hunt (23 images)

British stained glass artists and manufacturers
Glassmaking companies of England
Defunct glassmaking companies
Defunct companies of England
British companies established in 1750
Manufacturing companies established in 1750
Design companies disestablished in 1982
1750 establishments in England
1982 disestablishments in England
British companies disestablished in 1982